"(I Do It) For the Money" is a song written and recorded by Canadian country music artist Charlie Major. It was released in August 1995 as the first single from Major's album Lucky Man. The song reached number 1 on the RPM Country Tracks chart in October 1995.

Chart performance

Year-end charts

References

1995 singles
Charlie Major songs
Songs written by Charlie Major
1995 songs
Arista Records singles